Chust or CHUST may refer to:

 Chust culture, late Bronze Age and early Iron Age culture which flourished in the Fergana Valley of eastern Uzbekistan
 Chien Hsin University of Science and Technology, a university in Taoyuan County, Taiwan
 Chust (Hasidic dynasty), the name of several Hasidic dynasties
 Chust District, Namangan Region, Uzbekistan
 Chust, Uzbekistan, the capital of Chust District
 Chust knives, made in the Namangan Region
 Chust, Tajikistan, a village in Shahrinav District, Tajikistan
 Chust bug or Pentatomoidea, a superfamily of insects
 German, Czech, Slovak and Polish spelling of Khust, city in Ukraine